Finkenwerder (Low German: Finkwarder, Finkenwarder or - wärder; German: Finkeninsel; translation: Island of finches) is a quarter of Hamburg, Germany in the borough Hamburg-Mitte. It is the location of the Hamburg Airbus plant and its airport. In 2016 the population was 11,668.

Geography
According to the statistical office of Hamburg and Schleswig-Holstein, the quarter Finkenwerder has a total area of 19.3 km2. Parts of the quarter are covered by the port of Hamburg.

The western and northern border of the quarter are the Elbe river, across it lies the borough of Altona in the north. To the east Finkenwerder is bordered by the Köhlfleet channel, across it lies Waltershof, with which Finkenwerder also shares a small land border in the south-east. To the south and south-west Finkenwerders border runs along the old southern Elbe, across from it lie the quarters of Francop and Neuenfelde, the latter of which Finkenwerder shares another small land border with.

A small officially unnamed and uninhabited island, which is locally referred to as Schweinesand, is officially a part of Finkenwerder and represents its western-most point.

History

Finkenwerder was first mentioned in 1236 (as "Vinkenwerder"). The fishing village became part of Hamburg in 1445 and granted the status of a suburb (Vorort) in 1919.

During World War II until April 30, 1945 a concentration camp was established in Finkenwerder. It was a subcamp to the Neuengamme concentration camp. It was also the site of a U-boat bunker, which was heavily damaged by Tallboy and Grand Slam bombs in April 1945 and demolished post-war, although the foundations of the walls were uncovered during work to extend the runway of Hamburg-Finkenwerder Airport.

Demographics
11,629 people were living in the quarter Finkenwerder in 2006.

In 1999 there were 5,702 households, out of which 25.7% had children under the age of 18 living with them and 39.9% of all households were made up of individuals. The average household size was 2.1.

In 2006 there were 867 criminal offences (75 crimes per 1000 people).

Politics
Finkenwerder is part of the Finkenwerder regional assemby along with the districts of Waltershof and Neuwerk.

The current borough leader of Hamburg-Mitte, Ralf Neubauer (SPD), resides in Finkenwerder and served as its representative in the Hamburg parliament until 10 January 2022. Neubauer was replaced by Jörg Mehldau in parliament, who now represents the district and its constituency.

State elections 
These are the results of Finkenwerder and Waltershof in the Hamburg state elections since 1993:

Economy

Finkenwerder is divided into an industrial and rural area. The Airbus Hamburg-Finkenwerder manufacturing plant and associated airfield, as well as some facilities of the port of Hamburg are located in this quarter.

Infrastructure

Healthcare
As of 2006 Finkenwerder had six day-care centers for children, seven physicians in private practice, and three pharmacies.

Education 
There are two elementary (Westerschule & Aueschule Finkenwerder) as well as two secondary schools (Stadtteilschule & Gymnasium Finkenwerder) in the quarter.

Transportation 
The quarter is not serviced by the rapid rail transit system of Hamburg. Public transport is provided via buses of the HVV and two ferry lines on the Elbe River operated by HADAG.

According to the Department of Motor Vehicles (Kraftfahrt-Bundesamt), 4,354 private cars were registered in Finkenwerder (376 cars/1000 people). There were 58 traffic accidents total, including 45 traffic accidents with damage to persons.

See also
 List of subcamps of Neuengamme
 Hamburg Finkenwerder Airport
 Hamburger Flugzeugbau

Notes

References

Official German list of concentration camps Verzeichnis der Konzentrationslager und ihrer Außenkommandos gemäß § 42 Abs. 2 BEG 
 Statistical office Hamburg and Schleswig-Holstein Statistisches Amt für Hamburg und Schleswig-Holstein, official website

External links

 Information about the former Satellite Camp Hamburg-Finkenwerder
Coat of Arms

Quarters of Hamburg
Neuengamme concentration camp
Hamburg-Mitte